

B

Ba 

 
   

 

Babánekite (vivianite: IMA2012-007) 8.CE.  [no] [no] (IUPAC: tricopper diarsenate octahydrate)
Babefphite (IMA1966-003) 8.BA.15    (IUPAC: barium beryllium fluoro phosphate)
Babingtonite (rhodonite: 1824) 9.DK.05   
Babkinite (tetradymite: IMA1994-030) 2.GC.40e    (Pb2Bi2(S,Se)3)
Backite (tellurium oxysalt: IMA2013-113) 7.A  [no] [no] (IUPAC: dilead aluminium chloro tellurium(VI) hexaoxide)
Badakhshanite-(Y) (perettiite: IMA2018-085) 9.E  [no] [no]
Badalovite (alluaudite: IMA2016-053) 8.0  [no] [no]
Baddeleyite (baddeleyite: 1893) 4.DE.35    (IUPAC: zirconium(IV) dioxide)
Badengzhuite (phosphide: IMA2019-076) 1.0  [no] [no] (IUPAC: titanium phosphide)
Bafertisite (seidozerite, bafertisite: IMA2016 s.p., 1959) 9.BE.55   
Baghdadite (wohlerite: IMA1982-075) 9.BE.17    (IUPAC: hexacalcium dizirconium tetraoxo di(heptaoxodisilicate))
Bahariyaite (IMA2020-022)  [no] [no]
Bahianite (IMA1974-027) 4.DC.05    (IUPAC: pentaluminium triantimony(V) dihydro tetradecaoxide)
Baileychlore (chlorite: IMA1986-056) 9.EC.55   
Bainbridgeite-(YCe) (mckelveyite: IMA2020-065) 5.CC.  [no] [no]
Bairdite (IMA2012-061) 8.0  [no] [no]
Bakakinite (IMA2022-046)
Bakhchisaraitsevite (IMA1999-005) 8.CH.50   [no] (IUPAC: disodium pentamagnesium tetraphosphate heptahydrate)
Baksanite (tetradymite: IMA1992-042) 2.DC.05    (IUPAC: hexabismuth ditelluride trisulfide)
Balangeroite (IMA1982-002) 9.DH.35   
Balestraite (mica: IMA2013-080) 9.E?.  [no] [no] 
Balićžunićite (IMA2012-098) 7.A  [no] [no] (IUPAC: dibismuth oxo disulfate)
Balipholite (carpholite: 1975) 9.DB.05    (IUPAC: lithium barium dimagnesium trialuminium di(hexaoxodisilicate) octahydroxyl)
Balkanite (IMA1971-009) 2.BD.15    (IUPAC: pentasilver nonacopper mercury octasulfide)
Balliranoite (cancrinite: IMA2008-065) 9.FB.05  [no] 
Balyakinite (tellurite: IMA1980-001) 4.JK.15    (IUPAC: copper(II) tellurite(IV))
Bambollaite (IMA1965-014) 2.EB.05b   
Bamfordite (IMA1996-059) 4.FK.05    (IUPAC: iron(III) trihydro dimolybdenum hexaoxide monohydrate)
Banalsite (Y: 1944) 9.FA.60   
Bandylite (Y: 1938) 6.AC.35    (IUPAC: copper chloro tetrahydroxyborate)
Bannermanite (IMA1980-010) 4.HF.05   
Bannisterite (stilpnomelane: IMA1967-005) 9.EG.75   
Baotite (IMA1962 s.p., 1960) 9.CE.15   
Barahonaite 8.CH.60
Barahonaite-(Al) (IMA2006-051) 8.CH.60   
Barahonaite-(Fe) (IMA2006-052) 8.CH.60   
Bararite (fluorosilicate: 1951) 3.CH.10    (IUPAC: diammonium hexafluorosilicate)
Baratovite (baratovite: IMA1974-055) 9.CJ.25   
Barberiite (fluoroborate: IMA1993-008) 3.CA.10    (IUPAC: ammonium tetrafluoroborate)
Barbosalite (Y: 1954) 8.BB.40    (IUPAC: iron(II) diiron(III) dihydro diphosphate)
Barentsite (IMA1982-101) 5.BB.05    (IUPAC: heptasodium aluminium tetrafluoro dicarbonate dibicarbonate)
Bariandite (straczekite: IMA1970-043) 4.HE.20   
Barićite (vivianite: IMA1975-027) 8.CE.40    (IUPAC: tri(magnesium,iron) diphosphate octahydrate)
Barikaite (sartorite: IMA2012-055) 2.0  [no] [no] (Ag3Pb10(Sb8As11)Σ19S40)
Barioferrite (magnetoplumbite: IMA2009-030) 4.CC.45  [no] [no] (IUPAC: barium dodecairon(III) nonadecaoxide)
Bario-olgite (aphthitalite: IMA2003-002) 8.AC.40   
Bario-orthojoaquinite (joaquinite: IMA1979-081) 9.CE.25    (IUPAC: tetrabarium diiron(II) dititanium dioxo octa(trioxosilicate) monohydrate)
Barioperovskite (oxide perovskite: IMA2006-040) 4.CC.30   [no] (IUPAC: barium titanium trioxide)
Bariopharmacoalumite (pharmacosiderite: IMA2010-041) 8.DK.12  [no]  (IUPAC: (0.5)barium tetraluminium [tetrahydro triarsenate] tetrahydrate)
Barite
Bariumpharmacosiderite (pharmacosiderite: IMA1994 s.p., 1966 Rd) 8.DK.10   [no] (IUPAC: barium tetrairon(III) [tetrahydro triarsenate] pentahydrate)
Bariosincosite (IMA1998-047) 8.CJ.65    (IUPAC: barium di(oxovanadate) diphosphate tetrahydrate)
Barlowite (claringbullite: IMA2010-020) 3.DA.15  [no] [no] (IUPAC: tetracopper hexahydro bromide fluoride)
Barnesite (hewettite: IMA1967 s.p., 1963) 4.HG.45   
Barquillite (stannite: IMA1996-050) 2.KA.10    (IUPAC: dicopper (cadmium,iron) germanide tetrasulfide)
Barrerite (zeolitic tectosilicate: IMA1974-017) 9.GE.15   
Barringerite (barringerite: IMA1968-037) 1.BD.10    (IUPAC: di(iron,nickel) phosphide)
BarringtoniteN (Y: 1965) 5.CA.15    (IUPAC: magnesium carbonate dihydrate)
Barroisite [Na-Ca-amphibole: IMA2012 s.p., 1922] 9.DE.20   
Barrotite (chalcophyllite: IMA2011-063a) 7.0  [no] [no]
Barrydawsonite-(Y) (pectolite: IMA2014-042) 9.D?.  [no] [no]
Barstowite (IMA1989-057) 3.DC.95    (IUPAC: tetralead hexachloro carbonate monohydrate)
Bartelkeite (lawsonite: IMA1979-029) 9.J0.10    (IUPAC: lead iron(II) germanium (heptaoxodigermanate) dihydroxyl monohydrate)
Bartonite (djerfisherite: IMA1977-039) 2.FC.10    (K6Fe20S26S)
Barwoodite (welinite: IMA2017-046) 9.AF.  [no] [no]
Barylite (Y: 1876) 9.BB.15    (IUPAC: barium diberyllium heptaoxodisilicate)
Barysilite (Y: 1888) 9.BC.20    (IUPAC: octalead manganese tri(heptaoxodisilicate))
Baryte (baryte: IMA1971 s.p., 1797) 7.AD.35    (IUPAC: barium sulfate)
Barytocalcite (Y: 1824) 5.AB.45    (IUPAC: barium calcium dicarbonate)
Barytolamprophyllite (seidozerite, lamprophyllite: IMA1968 s.p., 1959) 9.BE.25   
Bassanite (rhabdophane: 1910) 7.CD.45     (IUPAC: calcium sulfate (0.5)hydrate)
Bassetite (Y: 1915) 8.EB.10    (IUPAC: iron(II) diuranyl diphosphate decawater)
Bassoite (IMA2011-028) 4.0  [no] 
Bastnäsite 05.BD.20a (IUPAC: REE fluoro carbonate)
Bastnäsite-(Ce) (IMA1987 s.p., 1841) 5.BD.20a   
Bastnäsite-(La) (IMA1966 s.p.) 5.BD.20a   
Bastnäsite-(Nd) (IMA2011-062) 5.BD.20a  [no] 
Bastnäsite-(Y) (IMA1987 s.p., 1970) 5.BD.20a   
Batagayite (IMA2017-002) 8.0  [no] [no]
Batievaite-(Y) (seidozerite, rinkite: IMA2015-016) 9.B?.  [no] 
Batiferrite (magnetoplumbite: IMA1997-038) 4.CC.45   
Batisite (batisite: IMA1962 s.p.) 9.DH.20    (IUPAC: disodium barium dititanium dioxo di(hexaoxodisilicate))
Batisivite (IMA2006-054) 9.BE.95   
Baumhauerite (sartorite: 1902) 2.HC.05b    (Pb12As16S36)
Baumhauerite IIQ (sartorite: 1959) 2.0  [no] [no]
Baumoite (IMA2017-054) 4.0  [no] [no]
Baumstarkite (aramayoite: IMA1999-049) 2.HA.25    (IUPAC: trisilver hexasulfa triantimonide)
Bauranoite (wolsendorfite: IMA1971-052) 4.GB.20    (IUPAC: barium diuranium heptaoxide (4-5)hydrate)
Bavenite (IMA2015 s.p., IMA1962 s.p., 1901) 9.DF.25   
Bavsiite (IMA2014-019) 9.0  [no] [no] (IUPAC: dibarium divanadium dioxo [dodecaoxotetrasilicate])
Bayerite (Y: 1928) 4.FE.10    (IUPAC: aluminium trihydroxide)
Bayldonite (Y: 1865) 8.BH.45    (IUPAC: tricopper lead dihydro oxo di(hydroxoarsenate))
Bayleyite (Y: 1951) 5.ED.05    (IUPAC: dimagnesium uranyl tricarbonate octadecahydrate)
Baylissite (IMA1975-024) 5.CB.45    (IUPAC: dipotassium magnesium dicarbonate tetrahydrate)
Bazhenovite (IMA1986-053) 2.FD.50    
Bazirite (benitoite: IMA1976-053) 9.CA.05    (IUPAC: barium zirconium nonaoxotrisilicate)
Bazzite (beryl: 1915) 9.CJ.05

Be 
Bearsite (IMA1967 s.p., 1962) 8.DA.05    (IUPAC: diberyllium hydro arsenate tetrahydrate)
Bearthite (brackebuschite: IMA1986-050) 8.BG.05    (IUPAC: dicalcium aluminium hydro diphosphate)
Beaverite 07.BC.10 (IUPAC: lead (diiron(III) Metal) hexahydro disulfate)
Beaverite-Cu (alunite, alunite: IMA2007-D, IMA1987 s.p., 1911 Rd) 7.BC.10   
Beaverite-Zn (alunite, alunite: IMA2010-086) 7.BC.10  [no] 
Bechererite (IMA1994-005) 7.DD.55   
Beckettite (sapphirine: IMA2015-001) 4.0  [no] [no] (Ca2V6Al6O20)
Becquerelite (Y: 1922) 4.GB.10    (IUPAC: calcium hexauranyl hexahydro tetraoxide octahydrate)
Bederite (wicksite: IMA1998-007) 8.CF.05    (IUPAC: dicalcium tetramanganese(II) diiron(III) hexaphosphate dihydrate)
Beershevaite (phosphate: IMA2020-095a)  [no] [no] (IUPAC: calcium triiron(III) oxotriphosphate)
Béhierite (zircon: IMA1967 s.p., 1961) 6.AC.15    (IUPAC: tantalum borate)
Behoite (cristobalite: IMA1969-031) 4.FA.05a    (IUPAC: beryllium dihydroxide)
Běhounekite (IMA2010-046) 7.0  [no] [no] (IUPAC: uranium disulfate tetrawater)
Beidellite (montmorillonite, smectite: 1925) 9.EC.40   
Belakovskiite (IMA2013-075) 7.0  [no]  (IUPAC: heptasodium uranyl tetrasulfate hydroxosulfate triwater)
Belendorffite (amalgam: IMA1989-024) 1.AD.10    (IUPAC: heptacopper hexamercury amalgam)
Belkovite (IMA1989-053) 9.BE.75   
Bellbergite (zeolitic tectosilicate: IMA1990-057) 9.GD.20   
Bellidoite (IMA1970-050) 2.BA.20    (IUPAC: dicopper selenide)
Bellingerite (Y: 1940) 4.KC.05    (IUPAC: tricopper hexaiodate dihydrate)
Belloite (IMA1998-054) 3.DA.10b   [no] (IUPAC: copper hydro chloride)
Belogubite (chalcanthite: IMA2018-005) 7.0  [no] [no] (IUPAC: copper zinc disulfate decahydrate)
Belomarinaite (aphthitalite: IMA2017-069a) 7.0  [no] [no] (IUPAC: potassium sodium sulfate)
Belousovite (IMA2016-047) 7.0  [no] [no] (IUPAC: potassium zinc chloro sulfate)
Belovite 8.BN.05 (IUPAC: sodium REE tristrontium fluoro triphosphate)
Belovite-(Ce) (apatite: 1954) 8.BN.05   
Belovite-(La) (apatite: IMA1995-023) 8.BN.05   
BelyankiniteQ (Y: 1950) 4.FM.25   
Bementite (IMA1963 s.p., 1888 Rd) 9.EE.05   
Benauite (alunite, crandallite: IMA1995-001) 8.BL.10    (IUPAC: strontium triiron(III) hexahydro phosphate hydroxophosphate)
Benavidesite (IMA1980-073) 2.HB.15     (IUPAC: tetralead manganese tetradecasulfa hexaantimonide)
Bendadaite (arthurite: IMA1998-053a) 8.DC.15   [no] (IUPAC: iron(II) diiron(III) dihydro diarsenate tetrahydrate)
Benitoite (benitoite: 1907) 9.CA.05    (IUPAC: barium titanium nonaoxotrisilicate)
Benjaminite (pavonite: IMA1975-003a, 1925 Rd) 2.JA.05e    (Ag3Bi7S12)
Benleonardite (pearceite-polybasite: IMA1985-043) 2.LA.50   
Bennesherite (melilite: IMA2019-068) 9.B  [no] [no] (IUPAC: dibarium iron(II) heptaoxo disilicate)
Benstonite (IMA1967 s.p., 1961) 5.AB.55    (IUPAC: hexabarium hexacalcium magnesium tridecacarbonate)
Bentorite (ettringite: IMA1979-042) 7.DG.15   
Benyacarite (IMA1995-002) 8.DH.35   
Beraunite (beraunite: 1841) 8.DC.27    (IUPAC: iron(II) pentairon(III) pentahydro tetraphosphate hexahydrate)
Berborite (IMA1967-004) 6.AB.10    (IUPAC: diberyllium hydro borate monohydrate)
Berdesinskiite (berdesinskiite: IMA1980-036) 4.CB.30    (IUPAC: divanadium(III) titanium pentaoxide)
Berezanskite (milarite: IMA1996-041) 9.CM.05   [no]
Bergenite (phosphuranylite: 1959) 8.EC.40   
Bergslagite (gadolinite: IMA1983-021) 8.BA.10    (IUPAC: calcium beryllium hydro arsenate)
Berlinite (quartz: 1868) 8.AA.05    (IUPAC: aluminium phosphate)
Bermanite (arthurite: 1936) 8.DC.20    (IUPAC: manganese(II) dimanganese(III) dihydro diphosphate tetrahydrate)
Bernalite (perovskite, söhngeite: IMA1991-032) 4.FC.05    (IUPAC: iron trihydroxide)
Bernardite (IMA1987-052) 2.HD.50    (IUPAC: thallium octasulfa pentarsenide)
Bernarlottiite (IMA2013-133) 2.0  [no] [no] (Pb12(As10Sb6)S36)
Berndtite (melonite: IMA1968 s.p., 1966) 2.EA.20    (IUPAC: tin(IV) sulfide)
Berryite (meneghinite: IMA1965-013) 2.HB.20d    (Cu3Ag2Pb3Bi7S16)
Berthierine (serpentine: 1832) 9.ED.15   
Berthierite (berthierite: 1827) 2.HA.20    (IUPAC: iron tetrasulfa diantimonide)
Bertossaite (carminite: IMA1965-038) 8.BH.25    (IUPAC: dilithium calcium tetraluminium tetrahydro tetraphosphate)
Bertrandite (Y: 1883) 9.BD.05    (IUPAC: tetraberyllium heptaoxodisilicate dihydroxyl)
Beryl (beryl: 1798) 9.CJ.05   
Beryllite (Y: 1954) 9.AE.05    (IUPAC: triberyllium tetraoxosilicate dihydroxyl monohydrate)
Beryllonite (beryllonite: 1888) 8.AA.10    (IUPAC: sodium beryllium phosphate)
Berzelianite (Y: 1832) 2.BA.20    ( (x ≈ 0.12))
Berzeliite (garnet: 1840) 8.AC.25    (IUPAC: (sodium dicalcium) dimagnesium triarsenate)
Beshtauite (IMA2012-051) 7.0  [no] [no] (IUPAC: diammonium uranyl disulfate dihydrate) Note: for beta-domeykite see domeykite-β, for beta-fergusonite series see fergusonite-beta series, for beta-sulfur see sulfur and for beta-roselite see roselite.
(Betafite group, pyrochlore supergroup )
Betekhtinite (Y: 1955) 2.BE.05   
Betpakdalite 8.DM.15
Betpakdalite-CaCa (IMA1967 s.p., 1961 Rd) 8.DM.15   
Betpakdalite-CaMg (IMA2011-034) 8.DM.15  [no] [no]
Betpakdalite-FeFe (IMA2017-011) 8.DM.15  [no] [no]
Betpakdalite-NaCa (IMA1971-057) 8.DM.15   
Betpakdalite-NaNa (IMA2011-078) 8.DM.15  [no] [no]
Bettertonite (IMA2014-074) 8.0  [no] [no] (IUPAC: hexaluminium nonahydro triarsenate pentawater undecahydrate)
Betzite (cancrinite: IMA2021-037)  [no] [no]
Beudantite (alunite, beudantite: IMA1987 s.p., 1826 Rd) 8.BL.05    (IUPAC: palladium triiron(III) hexahydro arsenate sulfate)
Beusite 8.AB.20 (IUPAC: M2+ dimanganese(II) diphosphate)
Beusite (graftonite: IMA1968-012) 8.AB.20   
Beusite-(Ca) (graftonite: IMA2017-051) 8.AB.20  [no] [no]
Beyerite (bismutite: 1943) 5.BE.35    (IUPAC: calcium dibismuth dioxo dicarbonate)
Bezsmertnovite (IMA1979-014) 2.BA.80   

Bi – Bo 
Biachellaite (cancrinite: IMA2007-044) 8.FB.05   [no]
Biagioniite (sulfosalt: IMA2019-120) 2.0  [no] [no] (IUPAC: dithallium disulfa antimonide)
Bianchiniite (IMA2019-022) 4.0  [no] [no] (IUPAC: dibarium (titanium vanadium) oxofluoro di(pentaoxodiarsenate))
Bianchite (hexahydrite: 1930) 7.CB.25    (IUPAC: zinc sulfate hexahydrate)
Bicapite (polyoxometalate: IMA2018-048) 8.0  [no] [no]
Bicchulite (sodalite: IMA1973-006) 9.FB.10   
Bideauxite (IMA1969-038) 3.DB.25    (IUPAC: silver dilead difluoride trichloride)
Bieberite (melanterite: 1845) 7.CB.35    (IUPAC: cobalt sulfate heptahydrate)
Biehlite (IMA1999-019a) 4.DB.60    (IUPAC: di((antimony,arsenic) oxide) molybdate)
Bigcreekite (IMA1999-015) 9.DF.30   [no] (IUPAC: barium pentaoxo disilicate tetrahydrate)
Bijvoetite-(Y) (IMA1981-035) 5.EB.20   
Bikitaite (zeolitic tectosilicate: IMA1997 s.p., 1957) 9.GD.55    (IUPAC: lithium hexaoxo aluminodisilicate monohydrate)
Bilibinskite (IMA1977-024) 2.BA.80    (IUPAC: lead trigold dicopper ditelluride)
Bílinite (halotrichite: 1914) 7.CB.85    (IUPAC: iron(II) diiron(III) tetrasulfate docosahydrate)
Billietite (Y: 1947) 4.GB.10    (IUPAC: barium hexauranyl hexahydro tetraoxide octahydrate)
Billingsleyite (IMA1967-012) 2.KB.05    (IUPAC: heptasilver hexasulfa arsenide)
Billwiseite (IMA2010-053) 4.0  [no]  (IUPAC: pentaantimony(III) triniobium tungsten octadecaoxide)
Bimbowrieite (dufrénite: IMA2020-006) 8.0  [no] [no]
BindheimiteQ (pyrochlore: IMA2013 s.p., IMA2010 s.p., 1800) 4.DH.20    Note: possibly oxyplumboroméite.
(Biotite, mica series (Y: 1963) 9.EC.   )
Biphosphammite (biphosphammite: 1870) 8.AD.15    (IUPAC: ammonium dihydrogen phosphate)
Biraite-(Ce) (IMA2003-037) 9.BE.90    (IUPAC: dicerium iron(II) heptaoxodisilicate carbonate) 
Birchite (IMA2006-048) 8.DB.70   [no] (IUPAC: dicadmium dicopper diphosphate sulfate pentahydrate)
Biringuccite (IMA1967 s.p., 1961) 6.EC.05    (IUPAC: disodium octaoxo hydro pentaborate monohydrate)
Birnessite (Y: 1956) 4.FL.45   
BiruniteQ (ettringite: 1957) 7.0  [no] [no]
Bischofite (Y: 1877) 3.BB.15    (IUPAC: magnesium dichloride hexahydrate)
Bismite (Y: 1868) 4.CB.60    (IUPAC: dibismuth trioxide)
Bismoclite (matlockite: 1935) 3.DC.25    (IUPAC: bismuth oxychloride)
Bismuth (arsenic: 1546) 1.CA.05   
Bismuthinite (stibnite: 1832) 2.DB.05    (IUPAC: dibismuth trisulfide)
Bismutite (bismutite: 1841) 5.BE.25    (IUPAC: dibismuth dioxo carbonate)
Bismutocolumbite (cervantite: IMA1991-003) 4.DE.30    (IUPAC: bismuth niobium tetraoxide)
Bismutoferrite (kaolinite: 1871) 9.ED.25    (IUPAC: diiron(III) bismuth di(tetraoxosilicate) hydroxyl)
Bismutohauchecornite (hauchecornite: IMA1978-F) 2.BB.10    (IUPAC: nonanickel dibismuth octasulfide)
BismutostibiconiteQ (pyrochlore: IMA2013 s.p., IMA2010 s.p., IMA1981-065, 1983) 4.DH.20    Note: possibly bismutoroméite.
Bismutotantalite (cervantite: 1929) 4.DE.30    (IUPAC: bismuth tantalum tetraoxide)
Bitikleite (garnet: IMA2009-052) 4.0  [no] [no] (IUPAC: tricalcium (tin antimony) tri(aluminium tetraoxide))
Bityite (mica: IMA1998 s.p., 1908) 9.EC.35   
Bixbyite (bixbyite) 4.CB.10
Bixbyite-(Fe) (bixbyite: IMA21-H) 4.CB.10  [no] [no]
Bixbyite-(Mn) (bixbyite: IMA21-H, 1897) 4.CB.10    (IUPAC: dimanganese(III) trioxide)
Bjarebyite (bjarebyite: IMA1972-022) 8.BH.20    (IUPAC: barium dimanganese(II) dialuminium trihydro triphosphate)
BlakeiteQ (tellurite: 1941) 4.JM.10  [no] [no]
Blatonite (IMA1997-025) 5.EB.10    (IUPAC: uranyl carbonate monohydrate)
Blatterite (Y: IMA1984-038) 6.AB.40   
Bleasdaleite (IMA1998-003a) 8.DK.25   
Blixite (IMA1962 s.p., 1958) 3.DC.50    (IUPAC: octalead pentaoxo dihydro tetrachloride)
Blödite (IMA1982 s.p., 1821) 7.CC.50    (IUPAC: disodium magnesium disulfate tetrahydrate)
Blossite (IMA1986-002) 8.FA.05    (IUPAC: dicopper heptaoxodivanadate(V))
Bluebellite (IMA2013-121) 4.0  [no] [no] (IUPAC: hexacopper chloro decahydro iodate)
Bluelizardite (IMA2013-062) 7.0  [no]  (IUPAC: heptasodium uranyl chloro tetrasulfate diwater)
Bluestreakite (IMA2014-047) 4.0  [no] [no]
Bobcookite (IMA2014-030) 7.0  [no] [no] (IUPAC: sodium aluminium diuranyl tetrasulfate octadecahydrate)
Bobfergusonite (alluaudite, bobfergusonite: IMA1984-072a) 8.AC.15   
Bobfinchite (schoepite: IMA2020-082)  [no] [no]
Bobierrite (vivianite: 1868) 8.CE.35    (IUPAC: trimagnesium diphosphate octahydrate)
Bobjonesite (IMA2000-045) 7.DB.25   [no] (IUPAC: vanadium(IV) oxosulfate trihydrate)
Bobkingite (IMA2000-029) 3.DA.50   [no] (IUPAC: pentacopper octahydro dichloride dihydrate)
Bobmeyerite (cerchiaraite: IMA2012-019) 9.C?.  [no] [no]
Bobshannonite (seidozerite, bafertisite: IMA2014-052) 9.B?.  [no] [no]
Bobtraillite (IMA2001-041) 9.CA.30   
Bodieite (IMA2017-117) 4.0  [no] [no] (IUPAC: dibismuth(III) ditellurite(IV) sulfate)
Bogdanovite (auricupride: IMA1978-019) 2.BA.80   
Bøggildite (Y: 1951) 3.CG.20    (IUPAC: disodium distrontium phosphate dialumino nonafluoride)
Boggsite (zeolitic tectosilicate: IMA1989-009) 9.GC.30   
Bøgvadite (IMA1987-029) 3.CF.15    (IUPAC: disodium dibarium strontium tetralumino icosafluoride)
Bohdanowiczite (IMA1978-C, 1967) 2.JA.20    (IUPAC: silver bismuth diselenide)
Böhmite (lepidocrocite: 1927) 4.FE.15    (IUPAC: hydroaluminium oxide)
Bohseite (bavenite: IMA2014-H, IMA2010-026) 9.D?.  [no] [no]
Bohuslavite (IMA2018-074a) 8.0  [no] [no]
Bokite (straczekite: IMA1967 s.p., 1963) 4.HE.20   
Bojarite (IMA2020-037)  [no] [no]
Boleite (Y: 1891) 3.DB.15    (KAg9Pb26Cu24Cl62(OH)48)
BolivariteQ (Y: 1921) 8.DF.10   [no] Note: possibly a variety of evansite.
Bolotinaite (IMA2021-088)
Boltwoodite (Y: 1956) 9.AK.15    (IUPAC: (kalium,sodium) uranyl hydroxosilicate (1.5)hydrate)
Bonaccordite (ludwigite: IMA1974-019) 6.AB.30    (IUPAC: dinickel iron(III) dioxoborate)
Bonacinaite (phosphosiderite: IMA2018-056) 8.0  [no] [no] (IUPAC: scandium arsenate dihydrate)
Bonattite (Y: 1957) 7.CB.10    (IUPAC: copper sulfate trihydrate)
Bonazziite (IMA2013-141) 2.FA.  [no] [no] (IUPAC: tetrarsenic tetrasulfide)
Bonshtedtite (bradleyite: IMA1981-026a) 5.BF.10    (IUPAC: trisodium iron(II) phosphate carbonate)
Boothite (melanterite: 1903) 7.CB.35    (IUPAC: copper sulfate heptahydrate)
Boracite (boracite: 1789) 6.GA.05    (IUPAC: trimagnesium chloro tridecaoxo heptaborate)
Boralsilite (IMA1996-029) 9.BD.30   [no] 
Borax (Y: old) 6.DA.10    (IUPAC: disodium tetrahydro pentaoxotetraborate octahydrate)
Borcarite (IMA1968 s.p., 1965) 6.DA.40   
Borisenkoite (lammerite-beta: IMA2015-113) 8.AB.  [no] [no]
Borishanskiite (IMA1974-010) 2.AC.45c   , (x = 0.0-0.2)
Bornemanite (seidozerite, lamprophyllite: IMA1973-053) 9.BE.50   
Bornhardtite (spinel, linnaeite: 1955) 2.DA.05   
Bornite (IMA1962 s.p., 1725) 2.BA.15    (IUPAC: pentacopper iron tetrasulfide)
Borocookeite (chlorite: IMA2000-013) 9.EC.55   [no]
Borodaevite (IMA1991-037) 2.JA.05g   
Boromullite (IMA2007-021) 9.AF.23   
Boromuscovite (mica: IMA1989-027) 9.EC.15   
Borovskite (IMA1972-032) 2.LA.60    (IUPAC: tripalladium antimonide tetratelluride)
Bortnikovite (alloy: IMA2006-027) 1.AG.65    (IUPAC: tetrapalladium tricopper zinc alloy)
Bortolanite (seidozerite: IMA2021-040a)  [no] [no]
Boscardinite (sartorite: IMA2010-079) 2.0  [no]  (TlPb4(Sb7As2)Σ=9S18) 
Bosiite (tourmaline: IMA2014-094) 9.CK.  [no] [no]
Bosoite (organic zeolite: IMA2014-023) 10.0  [no] [no]
Bostwickite (IMA1982-073) 9.HC.10   
Botallackite (atacamite: 1865) 3.DA.10b    (IUPAC: dicopper trihydro chloride)
Botryogen (botryogen: 1815) 7.DC.25    (IUPAC: magnesium iron(III) hydro disulfate heptahydrate)
Bottinoite (IMA1991-029) 4.FH.05    (IUPAC: nickel diantimony(V) dodecahydroxide hexahydrate)
Botuobinskite (crichtonite: IMA2018-143a)  [no] [no]
Bouazzerite (IMA2005-042) 8.DH.60   [no]
Boulangerite (Y: 1837) 2.HC.15    (IUPAC: pentalead undecasulfa tetraantimonide) 
Bournonite (bournonite: 1805) 2.GA.50    (IUPAC: copper lead trisulfa antimonide)
Bouškaite (IMA2018-055a) 7.0  [no] [no]
Boussingaultite (picromerite: 1864) 7.CC.60    (IUPAC: diammonium magnesium disulfate hexahydrate)
Bounahasite (IMA2021-114)
Bowieite (bowieite: IMA1980-022) 2.DB.15    (IUPAC: dirhodium trisulfide)
Bowlesite (cobaltite: IMA2019-079) 2.0  [no] [no] (IUPAC: platinum sulfa stannide)
Boyleite (starkeyite: IMA1977-026) 7.CB.15    (IUPAC: zinc sulfate tetrahydrate)

Br – By 
Braccoite (saneroite: IMA2013-093) 9.0  [no] [no]
Bracewellite ("O(OH)" group: IMA1967-035) 4.FD.10    (IUPAC: hydrochromium oxide)
Brackebuschite (brackebuschite: 1880) 8.BG.05    (IUPAC: dilead trimanganese hydro divanadate)
Bradaczekite (alluaudite: IMA2000-002) 8.AC.10   [no] (NaCuCuCu2(AsO4)3)
Bradleyite (bradleyite: 1941) 5.BF.10    (IUPAC: trisodium magnesium phosphate carbonate)
Braggite (Y: 1932) 2.CC.35a    (IUPAC: platinum sulfide)
Braithwaiteite (IMA2006-050) 8.DB.75   
Braitschite-(Ce) (IMA1967-029) 6.H0.10   
(Brammallite, mica series (Y: 1944) 9.EC.25   [no])
Branchite (Y: 1841, IMA2021 s.p.) 10.BA.10   
Brandãoite (IMA2017-071a) 8.CA.  [no] [no]
Brandholzite (IMA1998-017) 4.FH.05   [no] (IUPAC: magnesium diantimony dodecahydroxide hexahydrate)
Brandtite (roselite: 1888) 8.CG.10    (IUPAC: dicalcium manganese(II) diarsenate dihydrate)
Brannerite (brannerite: IMA1967 s.p., 1920) 4.DH.05    (IUPAC: uranium dititanium hexaoxide)
Brannockite (milarite: IMA1972-029) 9.CM.05   
Brassite (IMA1973-047) 8.CE.15    (IUPAC: manganese hydroxoarsenate tetrahydrate)
Brattforsite (IMA2019-127) 4.0  [no] [no] (Mn19As12O36Cl2)
Braunerite (IMA2015-123) 5.0  [no] [no] (IUPAC: dipotassium calcium uranyl tricarbonate hexahydrate)
Braunite (braunite: 1828) 9.AG.05    (IUPAC: manganese(II) hexamanganese(III) octaoxy tetraoxosilicate)
Brazilianite (Y: 1945) 8.BK.05    (IUPAC: sodium trialuminium tetrahydro diphosphate)
Bredigite (Y: 1948) 9.AD.20    (IUPAC: heptacalcium magnesium tetra(tetraoxosilicate))
Breithauptite (nickeline: 1833) 2.CC.05    (IUPAC: nickel antimonide)
Brendelite (IMA1997-001) 8.BM.15   
Brenkite (IMA1977-036) 5.BC.05    (IUPAC: dicalcium difluoro carbonate)
Brewsterite 9.GE.20
Brewsterite-Ba (zeolitic tectosilicate: IMA1997 s.p., 1993) 9.GE.20   
Brewsterite-Sr (zeolitic tectosilicate: IMA1997 s.p., 1822) 9.GE.20   
Breyite (IMA2018-062) 9.0  [no] [no] (IUPAC: tricalcium nonaoxotrisilicate)
Brezinaite (IMA1969-004) 2.DA.15    (IUPAC: trichromium tetrasulfide)
Brianite (aphthitalite: IMA1966-030) 8.AC.30    (IUPAC: disodium calcium magnesium diphosphate)
Brianroulstonite (IMA1996-009) 6.EC.35   
Brianyoungite (IMA1991-053) 5.BF.30    (IUPAC: trizinc tetrahydro carbonate)
Briartite (stannite: IMA1965-018) 2.KA.10    (IUPAC: dicopper iron germanium tetrasulfide)
Bridgesite-(Ce) (IMA2019-034) 7.0  [no] [no]
Bridgmanite (perovskite: IMA2014-017) 9.A0.  [no] [no] (IUPAC: magnesium trioxosilicate)
Brindleyite (serpentine: IMA1975-009a) 9.ED.15   
Brinrobertsite (corrensite: IMA1997-040) 9.EC.60   [no]
Britholite 09.AH.25
Britholite-(Ce) (britholite, apatite: IMA1987 s.p., 1901) 9.AH.25   
Britholite-(Y) (britholite, apatite: IMA1966 s.p., 1938) 9.AH.25   
Britvinite (molybdophyllite: IMA2006-031) 9.EG.70   [no]
Brizziite (corundum: IMA1993-044) 4.CB.05    (IUPAC: sodium antimonite)
Brochantite (brochantite: IMA1980 s.p., 1824) 7.BB.25    (IUPAC: tetracopper hexahydro sulfate)
Brockite (rhabdophane: IMA1967 s.p., 1962) 8.CJ.45   
Brodtkorbite (IMA1999-023) 2.BD.55    (IUPAC: dicopper mercury diselenide)
Bromargyrite (IMA1962 s.p., 1849) 3.AA.15    (IUPAC: silver bromide)
Bromellite (Y: 1925) 4.AB.20    (IUPAC: beryllium(II) oxide)
Brontesite (IMA2008-039) 3.AA.  [no]  (IUPAC: triammonium lead pentachloride)
Brookite (Y: 1825) 4.DD.10    (IUPAC: titanium dioxide)
Browneite (sphalerite: IMA2012-008) 2.00.  [no] [no] (IUPAC: manganese sulfide)
Brownleeite (silicide: IMA2008-011) 1.BB.   [no] (IUPAC: manganese silicide)
Brownmillerite (brownmillerite, perovskite: IMA1963-017) 4.AC.10    (IUPAC: dicalcium iron(III) aluminium pentaoxide)
Brucite (brucite: 1818) 4.FE.05    (IUPAC: magnesium dihydroxide)
Brüggenite (IMA1970-040) 4.KC.10    (IUPAC: calcium diiodate monohydrate)
BrugnatelliteQ (hydrotalcite: 1909) 5.DA.45   
Brumadoite (tellurium oxysalt: IMA2008-028) 7.C?.    (IUPAC: tricopper tetrahydro (tetraoxo tellurium(VI)) pentahydrate)
Brunogeierite (spinel, ulvöspinel: IMA1972-004 Rd) 9.AC.15    (IUPAC: diiron(II) tetraoxogermanate(IV))
Brushite (gypsum: 1865) 8.CJ.50    (IUPAC: calcium hydroxophosphate dihydrate)
Bubnovaite (aphthitalite: IMA2014-108) 7.AD.  [no] [no] (IUPAC: dipotassium octasodium calcium hexasulfate)
Buchwaldite (IMA1975-041) 8.AD.25    (IUPAC: sodium calcium phosphate)
Buckhornite (buckhornite: IMA1988-022) 2.HB.20b    (IUPAC: (dilead bismuth trisulfide)(gold ditelluride))
Buddingtonite (feldspar: IMA1963-001) 9.FA.30   
Bukovite (IMA1970-029) 2.BD.30    (IUPAC: tetracopper dithallium tetraselenide)
Bukovskýite (IMA1967-022) 8.DB.40    (IUPAC: diiron(III) hydro arsenate sulfate heptahydrate)
Bulachite (IMA1982-081) 8.DE.15    (IUPAC: dialuminium trihydro arsenate trihydrate)
Bulgakite (astrophyllite, astrophyllite: IMA2014-041) 9.DC.  [no] [no]
Bultfonteinite (spurrite-afwillite: 1932) 9.AG.80   
Bunnoite (IMA2014-054) 9.0  [no] [no]
Bunsenite (rocksalt, periclase: 1868) 4.AB.25    (IUPAC: nickel(II) oxide)
Burangaite (dufrenite: IMA1976-013) 8.DK.15    (IUPAC: sodium iron(II) pentaluminium hexahydro tetraphosphate dihydrate)
Burbankite (burbankite: 1953) 5.AC.30   
Burckhardtite (IMA1976-052) 9.EC.70   
Burgessite (burgessite: IMA2007-055) 8.CB.60    (IUPAC: dicobalt tetrawater di(hydroxoarsenate) water)
Burkeite (Y: 1921) 7.BD.25    (IUPAC: tetrasodium sulfate carbonate)
Burnettite (pyroxene: IMA2013-054) 9.00.  [no] [no] (CaVAlSiO6)
Burnsite (IMA2000-050) 4.JG.35   
Burovaite-Ca (labuntsovite: IMA2008-001) 9.CE.30c   [no]
Burpalite (wohlerite: IMA1988-036) 9.BE.17   
Burroite (decavanadate: IMA2016-079) 4.H?.  [no] [no]
Burtite (perovskite, schoenfliesite: IMA1980-078) 4.FC.10    (IUPAC: calcium tin(IV) hexahydroxide)
Buryatite (ettringite: IMA2000-021) 7.DG.15   [no]
Buseckite (wurtzite: IMA2011-070) 2.CB.45  [no] [no]
Buserite (IMA1970-024) 4.FL.35  [no] [no] (IUPAC: tetrasodium tetradecamanganese heptacosaoxide henicosahydrate) Note: it dehydrates to birnessite.
Bushmakinite (brackebuschite: IMA2001-031) 8.BG.05   [no]
Bussenite (seidozerite, bafertisite: IMA2000-035) 9.BE.65   [no]
Bussyite 9.EA.
Bussyite-(Ce) (IMA2007-039) 9.EA.80   
Bussyite-(Y) (IMA2014-060) 9.EA.  [no] 
Bustamite (Y: 1826) 9.DG.05   
Butianite (nuwaite: IMA2016-028) 2.0  [no] [no]
Butlerite (Y: 1928) 7.DC.10    (IUPAC: iron(III) hydro sulfate dihydrate)
Bütschliite (Y: 1947) 5.AC.15    (IUPAC: dipotassium calcium dicarbonate)
Buttgenbachite (connellite: 1925) 3.DA.25   
Byelorussite-(Ce) (joaquinite: IMA1988-042) 9.CE.25   
Bykovaite (IMA2003-044) 9.BE.55   
Byrudite (humite: IMA2013-045) 4.CA.  [no] [no]
Bystrite (cancrinite-sodalite: IMA1990-008) 9.FB.05   
Byströmite (tapiolite: 1952) 4.DB.10    (IUPAC: magnesium diantimony(V) hexaoxide)
Bytízite (IMA2016-044) 2.0  [no] [no] (IUPAC: tricopper antimony triselenide)
Byzantievite (IMA2009-001) 9.0  [no] [no]

External links
IMA Database of Mineral Properties/ RRUFF Project
Mindat.org - The Mineral Database
Webmineral.com
Mineralatlas.eu minerals B

la:Index mineralium, A-B
hu:Ásványok listája (A–B)